Sophie Daneman is a British soprano specializing in the baroque repertoire.

Biography 
Sophie Daneman, a daughter of the actor Paul Daneman, studied at the Guildhall School of Music and Drama in London.

She became known during the 1990s with the baroque music ensemble Les Arts Florissants, spearhead of the  movement led by William Christie, with whom she interpreted mainly great names of the French baroque such as Montéclair, Rameau, Charpentier, Mondonville and Couperin.

In addition to William Christie, Daneman worked under the direction of numerous choir directors, such as Christopher Hogwood, Robert King, Gérard Lesne, Jean-Claude Malgoire, Neville Marriner, Philippe Herreweghe, and Nicholas McGegan.

Selected discography 
Daneman has recorded for the labels Erato, Harmonia Mundi, EMI Classics and Virgin Records.

With Les Arts Florissants 
 1992: Jephté by Michel Pignolet de Montéclair
 1993: Castor et Pollux by Jean-Philippe Rameau (a sequel to Hébé/Un Plaisir)
 1994:  by Jean-Philippe Rameau
 1995: Médée by Marc-Antoine Charpentier
 1995: La descente d'Orphée aux enfers by Marc-Antoine Charpentier
 1996: Les plaisirs de Versailles by Marc-Antoine Charpentier
 1997: Grands Motets by Jean-Joseph Cassanéa de Mondonville
 1997: Les Fêtes d'Hébé by Jean-Philippe Rameau
 1997: Leçons de ténèbres by François Couperin
 1999: Acis and Galatea by Handel
 2001: La guirlande by Jean-Philippe Rameau (Zélide)
 Theodora by Handel (Theodora)
 2011: John Blow: Venus and Adonis, directed Elizabeth Kenny (Wigmore Hall Live) (Venus)

With the Collegium Musicum 90 
 1997: Ottone in Villa d'Antonio Vivaldi (Tullia)

With the Philharmonia Baroque Orchestra 
 1999: Arianna in Creta de Haendel (Arianne)

Other 
 1997: Songs & Duets, Vol. 1 by Félix Mendelssohn with Nathan Berg (baritone) and Eugene Asti (piano)
 1999: Songs & Duets, Vol. 2 by Félix Mendelssohn with Stephan Loges (baritone) and Eugene Asti (piano)
 2001: Lieder by Schumann with Julius Drake (piano)
 2001: Irish, Welsh & Scottish songs by Beethoven, with Peter Harvey, Paul Agnew, Alessandro Moccia, Alix Verzier and Jérôme Hantaï

References

External links 
 Sophie Daneman on Musical world
 
 Sophie Daneman on Hazardchase.co.uk
 Sophie Daneman on Bach Cantatas Website
 Sophie Daneman on Oxford Lieder
 Sophie Daneman on Hyperion Records
 Interview of Sophie Daneman on Classicagenda.fr
 

Living people
Year of birth missing (living people)
English operatic sopranos
Women performers of early music
British performers of early music
Alumni of the Guildhall School of Music and Drama
20th-century British women opera singers
21st-century British women opera singers
Erato Records artists
EMI Classics and Virgin Classics artists